Makarand Dave, also referred as Sai Makarand Dave, was a Gujarati poet and author from Gujarat, India.

Biography 
Dave was born in Gondal (now in Rajkot district, Gujarat) on 13 November 1922 to Vajeshankar Dave. After completing his school education in Gondal, he joined the Dharamsinhji College, Rajkot in 1940. He left studies in 1942 to participate in the Quit India movement of the Indian independence movement. In early life, he came in a contact with his spiritual teacher, Nathalal Joshi. He married an author Kundanika Kapadia in 1968. He moved to Mumbai later.
He served as the editor of Kumar (1944–45), Urmi Navrachna (1946), Sangam, Parmarthi magazines and Jai Hind daily.

With his wife, he moved from Mumbai to Dharampur near Valsad in 1987 and established Nandigram, an ashram for the welfare of tribal people as well as a spiritual centre.

He was referred as Sai by Swami Anand.

He died on 31 January 2005 at Nandigram near Vankal village in Valsad district, Gujarat.

Works 
Dave wrote poetry, philosophy and on spirituality extensively.

Vartasangraha
 Gulabi Aaras Ni Laggi 
 Mor Banglo
 Nagar Vase Chhe

Poetry 

In Gujarati:
 Suraj Kadach Uge
 Tarana (1951)
 Jayabharee (1952)
 Goraj (1957)
 Suajmukhi (1961)
 Sangnya (1964)
 Sangati (1968)

Spirituality 
In Gujarati:

Antarvedi
 Tapovan Ni Vaate
 Peed Parayi
 Bhagavathi Sadhana
 Vishnu Sahasranam
 Bhajan Ras
 Yogi Harnath Na Sanidya 
 Ram Name Tarakmantra
 Shiva Mahimna Stotra
 Aabhala
 Sahaj Ne Kinare
 Ashvamedh Yagna
 Chindanand
 Chirantana
 Dampatya Yog
 Garbhadeep
 Janam Janamni Kunchi
 Mati No Mahekto Sad
 Shree Hanumant Charne
 Garudapurana
 Suraya Ni Amantran Patrika
 Dhummas Ne Pele Paar
 Chhip no Chahero
 Savitri Vidya
 Yagna Vidya
 Laghustav

Spiritual poetry 
In Gujarati

 Koi Ghatma Gaheke Gheru
 Zabuk Vizadi Zabuk
 Dampatya - Yog Ane Nava Lagna Geeto
 Hava Bari (Ghazals)
 Gulal Ane Gunjar
 Partiroop

Others 
In English

 Prometheus : The Living Flame of Love
 Shiva : The Light of Lights
 Homeage to Mother Liberty
 Immortal Face of America
 Bhaktamar 
 Yoga of Marriage

Recognition
Dave was awarded the Ranjitram Suvarna Chandrak in 1979. He also received the Sahitya Gaurav Puraskar (1997), Narsinh Mehta Award, Aurobindo Award for philosophical and other works.

See also
Babubhai P. Vaidya
List of Gujarati-language writers

References

External links 
 A Fish's Wish, a poem by Makarand Dave

1922 births
2005 deaths
Indian male poets
Gujarati-language writers
People from Rajkot district
Gujarati people
Poets from Gujarat
20th-century Indian poets
Recipients of the Ranjitram Suvarna Chandrak
20th-century Indian male writers